Addaea pusilla is a species of moth of the family Thyrididae. It is found in Papua New Guinea and Australia.

References

Moths described in 1887
Thyrididae